Václav Malý (born 21 September 1950 in Prague) is a Czech Catholic priest and a prominent persona of the 1989 Velvet Revolution. He is a titular bishop of Marcelliana and auxiliary bishop of Prague.

Early life
Václav Malý studied at the Roman Catholic Saints Cyril and Methodius Faculty in Litoměřice (since 1990 part of the Roman Catholic Theological Faculty of the Charles University) from 1969 to 1976. He was ordained a priest on 26 June 1976.

Political activities

During the communist regime period in Czechoslovakia, prior to the Velvet revolution in 1989, Václav Malý was a signatory of Charter 77 and, in 1978, a founding member of the Committee for the Defense of the Unjustly Prosecuted. In January 1979, he was officially forbidden from exercising his activity as a priest and was imprisoned without trial from May to December 1979. From 1980 to 1989 he worked as a fireman and surveyor, while secretly continuing to minister as a priest and participating in the creation of a Catholic samizdat. In 1989, during the Velvet Revolution, he was one of the main spokesmen for the Civic Forum and a member of the opposition delegation during the negotiations with the government of Ladislav Adamec. During the 4 December 1989 mass demonstration in Wenceslas Square, he publicly read out the Civic Forum statement demanding free elections the following year and the immediate formation of a coalition government.

In November 2021, Emmanuel Macron, the president of France, awarded Václv Malý with the highest French order of merit, the Legion of Honour, for his personal commitment to human rights. Václav Malý received the order at the French Embassy in Prague.

Ecclesiastical career
Václav Malý was appointed auxiliary bishop of Prague on 11 January 1997.

References

External links

1950 births
Living people
People from Prague
Officers Crosses of the Order of Merit of the Federal Republic of Germany
Chevaliers of the Légion d'honneur
Czechoslovak Roman Catholic priests
20th-century Czech Roman Catholic priests
21st-century Czech Roman Catholic priests